Mohammad Ibrahim is a Bangladeshi footballer who plays as a winger. He currently plays for Bangladesh Premier League club Sheikh Russel KC and the Bangladesh national team.

International career
On 1 October 2018, Ibrahim made his senior career debut against Laos during 2018 Bangabandhu Cup.

On 19 January 2020, Ibrahim scores his first international goal against Sri Lanka national football team

International goals
Scores and results list Bangladesh's goal tally first.

References 

1995 births
Living people
Bangladeshi footballers
Bangladesh international footballers
Mohammedan SC (Dhaka) players
Abahani Limited (Chittagong) players
Saif SC players
Bashundhara Kings players
Sheikh Russel KC players
Association football midfielders
Footballers at the 2018 Asian Games
Asian Games competitors for Bangladesh